The Benedict House and Shop is a historic property at 57 Rockwell Road in Ridgefield, Connecticut.  Built in 1740, the connected house and shop are among the oldest surviving buildings in the community.  The shop is a particularly rare example of a cobbler's workshop of the 19th century.  They are further notable for the sympathetic restoration they underwent at the hands of architect Cass Gilbert.  The property was added to the National Register of Historic Places on December 4, 1998.

Description and history
The Benedict House and Shop stand southeast of Ridgefield's town center, on a sloping lot overlooking Rockwell Road to the south.  The house is a -story timber-frame structure, with a gabled roof and off-center chimney.  The first floor of the facade is sheltered by a hip-roofed porch with square posts, with small (apparently original) fixed six-pane windows between the porch roof and main roof cornice.  Attached to the left side of the house is the workshop, a single-story timber structure with gabled roof, which is set on a high foundation due to the steeply sloping terrain.  The interior of the house is a modified center chimney plan, owing to the addition of the third bay during Cass Gilbert's restoration.

The house was built in 1740 for a member of the Benedict family, who were among the first colonial settlers of the town..  It is significant as a rare surviving example of a colonial artisan's workshop.  Although the early residents of the house (all Benedicts) were apparently engaged in a variety of rural agricultural and business pursuits, several generations in the 19th century were cobblers.  The property is one of four in Ridgefield that Cass Gilbert restored (the Keeler Tavern in the town center is another).

See also
National Register of Historic Places listings in Fairfield County, Connecticut

References

Houses on the National Register of Historic Places in Connecticut
Houses completed in 1740
Houses in Ridgefield, Connecticut
National Register of Historic Places in Fairfield County, Connecticut
1740 establishments in the Thirteen Colonies